The Naugatuck River is a  river in the U.S. state of Connecticut.  Its waters carve out the Naugatuck River Valley in the western reaches of the state, flowing generally due south and eventually emptying into the Housatonic River at Derby, Connecticut and thence  to Long Island Sound.  The Plume and Atwood Dam in Thomaston, completed in 1960 following the Great Flood of 1955, creates a reservoir on the river and is the last barrier to salmon and trout migrating up from the sea.

History
Various Algonquian bands, often included in the Wappinger tribe, originally inhabited the Naugatuck River Valley.  In fact, the name "Naugatuck" is derived from an Algonquian term meaning "lone tree by the fishing place".  One early 19th century author explained that this name originally referred to a specific tree along the river in the area of modern-day Beacon Falls, but came to be applied broadly to the entire river over time. The valley was later settled in the 17th century by English colonists. Given its rocky soil, which was not good for farming, and the high potential for water power, the Naugatuck Valley became an industrialized area in the 19th century. It has been associated with the brass and copper industries.

Watershed and course

From this point on, the Naugatuck River has been followed by early paths and roadways and is now followed by Connecticut Route 8. The river enters a forested, hilly area between Connecticut Route 118 and Thomaston.

Ecology and conservation
As part of the Housatonic River watershed, the Naugatuck River historically hosted the southernmost Atlantic salmon (Salmo salar) migrations. Historical runs of anadromous fish also included native American shad (Alosa sapidissima, Connecticut's state fish), alewife (Alosa pseudoharengus) and blueback herring (Alosa aestivalis). Dam construction for hydropower, cooling and rinse water, and boiler water for industry began circa 1763 and continued during the industrial revolution of the 1800s. These dams, as well as wastewater from the towns that grew up around factories along the river, contributed to the extirpation of many species of fish. Over time and with the closing of many of the factories, the dams ceased to provide hydropower or serve any other economic purpose. The Anaconda Dam (Waterbury), Freight Street Dam (Waterbury), Union City Dam (Naugatuck) and the Platts Mill Dam (Naugatuck) were removed in 1999, while the Kinneytown Dam was bypassed with a fish ladder that same year.  The Chase Brass Dam, between Waterbury and Thomaston, was removed in 2004. A fish bypass channel, the first of its kind in New England, now permits fish to migrate past the Tingue Dam and opens an additional  of the river to anadromous fish migration. The installation of the fish bypass on the Tingue Dam in Seymour leaves only the Plume and Atwood Dam in Thomaston as the last barrier on the river to fish migration.

The State of Connecticut Department of Energy and Environmental Protection (DEEP) stocks surplus Atlantic salmon (Salmo salar) from the Connecticut River restoration effort in the Naugatuck River each fall. DEEP also stocks several salmonid species including native brook trout (Salvelinus fontinalis) and non-native sea-run brown trout (Salmo trutta) and rainbow trout (Oncorhynchus mykiss).

Recreation and activities
The Naugatuck River is a popular destination for fishing in northwestern Connecticut, though not on the same scale as the Farmington or Housatonic rivers. The Connecticut Department of Environmental Protection stocks the river with broodstock Atlantic Salmon between Route 118 in Harwinton/Litchfield and the Thomaston Dam, and from southern Naugatuck to Beacon Falls. The Naugatuck has a trout management area between Route 118 and the Thomaston Dam. It is considered a "trophy trout stream" the rest of its length between the confluence of the East and West Branches and the Kinneytown Dam in Seymour.

Landmarks of note associated with the Naugatuck include Reynolds Bridge, an open-spandrel concrete arch bridge in Thomaston which carries Waterbury Road over the river.  Built in 1928, the crossing is listed on the National Register of Historic Places.

See also

List of rivers of Connecticut

References

External links
 Naugatuck River Watershed Association
 Naugatuckriver.net
 Maps of the Naugatuck River Watershed

Naugatuck River Valley
Connecticut placenames of Native American origin
Rivers of New Haven County, Connecticut
Rivers of Connecticut
Tributaries of Housatonic River